DAV Institute of Engineering and Technology (DAVIET) is an elite engineering institute in Jalandhar City, established by the Dayanand Anglo-Vedic College Trust and Management Society offering undergraduate and graduate and doctoral courses. The DAV College Trust and Management Society is the largest non-government educational organization in India, managing a chain of about 700 institutions in India and abroad. The institute is located in the heart of city adjacent to DAV College, Jalandhar, on the left side of the Jalandhar-Amritsar National Highway.

The institute is approved by AICTE All India Council for Technical Education and affiliated to IK Gujral Punjab Technical University, Jalandhar. It received ISO 9001:2000 certification in 2005 under joint accreditation of SGS Group and UKAS (United Kingdom Accreditation Service) Quality Management. It has received A NAAC Accreditation.

Academics

The institute offers following graduate, post graduate programs.

Undergraduate departments
Electrical Engineering
Computer Science and Engineering
Information Technology
Mechanical Engineering
Electronics and Communication Engineering
Civil Engineering
Applied Sciences

Postgraduate departments
Electrical Engineering
Computer Science and Engineering
Civil Engineering
Electronics and Communication Engineering
Mechanical Engineering
Nano Technology
Master of Business Administration
Master of Computer Applications

The Institute offers DOEACC courses under Continuing Engineering Education Programmes
DOEACC - O level
DOEACC - A level
DOEACC - B level

Institute has a Research Foundation set up to promote research capabilities under various areas of Engineering and Technology viz. English Language & Literature, Nano Technology, Light Wave Technology System, Robotics, VLSI Design, SEED Programme, Wireless System Design, Software Engineering etc. CIE (The centre of Incubation and Entrepreneurship) was established in the institute to promote culture of entrepreneurship among students.

Infrastructure

Core Block
Research & Development Block
Under Graduate Block
Post Graduate Block
Material Science Block
Knowledge Centre
Lala Chanchaal Dass Auditorium
Convention Hall
Guest House

Hostels
UG Hostel
PG Hostel
Girls Hostel

National rankings

 Ranked 10th in the category of outstanding engineering colleges of excellence in India in Competition Success Review-GHRDC Engineering Colleges Survey 2016.
 Best Engineering College of Punjab Technical University 2013 
 Ranked 2nd in Most Promising Engineering Institute as per Competition Success Review–GHRDC Rankings 2009
 A survey by Dataquest on top technical schools in India placed DAVIET at 60th All India Rank. The survey containing the national rankings was released on 22 December 2009.
 Best DAV Institute Award by D.A.V. College Managing Committee , New Delhi in 2005* 
 DAVIET is the coveted winner of the IMC Ramkrishna Bajaj National Quality Commendation Certificate 2006

Conferences
 National Congress on Science-Technology and Management (DAV-NCSTM) 2014 
 National Seminar on Communication and Soft Skills - The Emerging Paradigms - 2010
 National Conference on Modern Management Practices and Information Technology Trends (MMPITT) - 2009
 National Conference on Optical and Wireless Communication (NCOW) - 2008 
 10th Punjab Science Congress - 2007

See also 

 Arya Samaj

References

External links
 

Engineering colleges in Punjab, India
Education in Jalandhar
Universities and colleges affiliated with the Arya Samaj
2001 establishments in Punjab, India
Educational institutions established in 2001